Blunts Wood and Paiges Meadow is a   local nature reserve in Haywards Heath in West Sussex. It is owned and managed by Mid Sussex District council.

This site has diverse habitats with a pond, wetland, hedgerows, grassland, birch woodland, hazel coppice, mixed coppice and bluebell woodland.

References

External links
 

Local Nature Reserves in West Sussex